Ath Mansour Taourirt is a town and commune in Bouïra Province, Algeria. According to the 1998 census it has a population of 9,283.

References

Communes of Bouïra Province